Concern Morinformsystem-Agat is a Russian joint stock company that engages in the development and production of integrated structures for the military-industrial sector in the Russian Federation and internationally. The original company was established in 1942 as a Special Design Bureau (SDB) of the People's Commissariat of the Shipbuilding Industry of the USSR.

Morinformsystem-Agat manufactures equipment and instruments for warships. Scientific Production Association Agat is the core company of the concern.

Its products include the Klub-S and Klub-N missile fire-control systems, Bal-E missile systems, MR-123 and Puma (5P-10) artillery systems, and radar stations.

References

External links
  

Defence companies of Russia
Companies established in 2004
Companies based in Moscow
2004 establishments in Russia
Government-owned companies of Russia
Holding companies of Russia
Defence companies of the Soviet Union